Chandra Kant Raut, popularly known as  CK Raut, is a Nepali Member of Parliament (MP), computer Missile engineer, former United States Defense Programmer, author, politician and activist. He is gold medalist in Bachelors of Engineering from Tribhuvan University. He was active in the Alliance for Independent Madhesh, to establish a country for the Madhesi people. In 2022 Nepalese general election, he was elected as a Member of Parliament of the Pratinidhi Sabha. He defeated the incumbent Upendra Yadav, a former minister.

In the past, he has been frequently placed under house-arrest by the Government of Nepal. He quitted the movement for another single country and joined the mainstream politics forming Janamat Party in 2019.

Early life
Raut was born in Mahadeva village of Saptari district of Nepal. He attended primary school in his village and high school in Laxmi Ballav Narsingh Secondary School in Babhangama Katti. He went on to study at Tribhuvan University (Nepal), Tokyo University (Japan) and Cambridge University (UK). He is a recipient of Young Nepalese Engineer Award, Mahendra Bidhya Bhusan, Kulratna Gold Medal, and Trofimenkoff Academic Achievement Award.

Political life

Alliance for Independent Madhesh 
Raut was the president and the founding member of Alliance for Independent Madhesh, which in its manifesto has described itself as a coalition of Terai people discriminated by Pahadi civilisation. It has people of various sub-ethnicities, activists, parties and various organisations who are working towards establishing an independent Madhesh. Although it was established in 2007, it did not announce their manifesto until a press conference in Kathmandu on 21 May 2012. The manifesto states the main objective of the alliance is to achieve independence of Madhesh through peaceful and non-violent means. It has also demanded an end an end to racism, slavery and discrimination imposed on Nepali people of Madheshi origin by the Pahadi people. It claims to have three pillars: independent Madhesh of Nepal, non-violence and peaceful means, and a democratic system.

Arrest 
On 13 September 2014, the Government of Nepal arrested Raut for on the grounds of sedition after giving a speech to a gathering of Santhals, an indigenous population of Nepalese, in their annual festival. After his arrest, Raut began to fast in protest, arguing that his right to freedom and expression was being violated by the government. He was subsequently hospitalized on 25 September after complaints of severe stomach pain. Nepali Congress Vice-President Ram Chandra Poudel, Minister for Information and Communications Minendra Rijal, and Agriculture Minister Hari Parajuli visited Raut in the hospital to urge him to end his fast. Raut ended his fast on the 1 October, after 11 days, upon the Nepalese government's request and commitment to respect freedom of expression. The Attorney Office filed a sedition case at the Special Court on 8 October.

Speech in Biratnagar 
On 3 January 2015, Raut was again arrested while giving a speech at degree College. Many supporters were injured following a clash with police. A dozen police personnel were also injured. Raut's supporters claimed police had used brutal force and did not allow him to be hospitalised locally for injuries incurred during the clash.

Janamat Party formation 
Raut quitted the secessionist movement on 8 March 2019 signing agreement with Prime minister KP Sharma Oli. Subsequently, Janamat Party was formed by Raut on 18 March 2019.

Electoral Performance

2022 Nepalese general election

International support
New York City based Human Rights Watch issued the statement on the arrest and subsequent filing of sedition charges against Raut.

Asian Human Rights Commission stated, that everyone has the rights to freedom of speech, movement, peaceful assembly and association are the fundamental rights of all human beings everywhere, as also mandated by the United Nations Universal Declaration of Human Rights, of which Nepal is a signatory, we expect acknowledgement and assurance of our rights from the state and its agencies. The AHRC urges the government of Nepal to immediately release Dr Chandra Kant Raut. The AHRC fears possible torture, harassment and other ill treatment during their arbitrary arrest by the Morang Police." Amnesty International also wrote a letter to the Nepalese Minister for Home Affairs, demanding Raut's release.

Books and films
 मधेश स्वराज / Madhesh Swaraj
 मधेश का इतिहास / A History of Madhesh
 वीर मधेशी / Bir Madheshi
 वैरागदेखि बचावसम्म (आत्मकथा) [Denial to Defense]
 Black Buddhas: The Madheshis of Nepal (documentary)

References

Living people
Madhesi people
People from Saptari District
Tribhuvan University alumni
Alumni of the University of Cambridge
University of Tokyo alumni
Nepalese scientists
Computer scientists
Nepalese male writers
Nepalese activists
Nepalese film directors
People from Rajbiraj
Nepalese political party founders
Pulchowk Campus alumni
Nepal MPs 2022–present
1977 births